The Governor of Sakhalin Oblast is the head of the executive branch of the Government of Sakhalin Oblast and the highest official of the oblast. The governor has a duty to enforce state laws in the region and to approve bills passed by the Sakhalin Oblast Duma or to disapprove it.

Since the formation of the position in 1991 there have been eight governors, including two  interim governors. Igor Farkhutdinov was the only governor to die in office. The current governor, Valery Limarenko, has been interim governor since December 7, 2018.

The longest serving governors were Igor Farkhtdinov and Aleksandr Khoroshavin, who both served for 8 years in the office.

Powers 

 Forms the government, appoint the main officials of the provincial government. Performs the power of the highest official of the oblast.
 Take decision on the strategic development of the oblast and make socio-economic policy of the oblast.
 Ensures the observance of rights and freedoms of the citizen living in the oblast. Implementation of Federal and oblast laws and the Russian legislation in the oblast.
 Solves the issue of civil service. He/she appoints or dismissed the main holders of post of the oblast government.
 Appoints the head of the districts of oblast.
 Holds meetings of the oblast government on serious issues.
 Issue decrees and orders to implement law in the oblast.

List of governors

Timeline

See also 
 Sakhalin Oblast

References 

Politics of Sakhalin Oblast
Sakhalin